John Albert Bailey (26 June 1912 – 18 February 1989) was a British screen and TV actor who had a long screen, stage and TV career. He was born in South East London.

He took a number of film roles during the late 1940s and early 1950s which included a sinister role, Stringer, in High Treason. During the 1960s, he appeared in a number of high-profile BBC TV roles such as in Doctor Who and Steptoe and Son. Most famously, he played the artist Aubrey Green in The Forsyte Saga in (1967). He also took the lead in a highly acclaimed Wednesday Play.

One of his notable early films was High Treason by Roy Boulting (1951). Set in a tense and austere London during the early Cold War, the tense plot follows the secret services MI5 pursuing a terrorist cell group. John Bailey's cold and ruthless assassin, Stringer, speaks with a convincing Russian accent. As an actor, he had considerable vocal range, notably employing a clipped, upper class English accent as Inspector Grant in Josephine Tey's The Franchise Affair (1951). His dark looks and convincing accents led to roles as Italians or Eastern Europeans.

BBC TV's The Wednesday Play about Sacco and Vanzetti (1965) addressed the topical issue of the death penalty. Written by Jean Benedetti the play was entitled The Good Shoe Maker and the Poor Fish Pedlar. John Bailey played Bartolomeo Vanzetti, an Italian immigrant in America whose execution was widely regarded as having been a miscarriage of justice.

He also made various appearances in Doctor Who, including "The Sensorites" (1964), playing Edward Waterfield in "The Evil of the Daleks" (1967) and "The Horns of Nimon" (1979-80), as well as appearing in several episodes of The Avengers and as Hans Frank in the 1978 American television miniseries Holocaust.

Selected filmography
 It Happened in Soho (1948)
 Meet Simon Cherry (1949)
 Man on the Run (1949)
 Celia (1949)
 Cairo Road (1950)
 Circle of Danger (1951) as Pape Llewellyn
 The Franchise Affair (1951) as Inspector Grant
 High Treason (1951) as Stringer
 Venetian Bird (1952) as Lieutenant Longo
 The Night Won't Talk (1952) as Clayton Hawkes
 So Little Time (1952)
 The Hostage (1956)
 Operation Amsterdam (1959) as an officer
 Moment of Danger (1960)
 Never Let Go (1960) as MacKinnon
 Rasputin, the Mad Monk (1966) as the royal physician
 A Choice of Kings (1966) as FitzOsbern
 Running Scared (1972) as Inspector
 The 14 (1973) as Mr. Sanders
 Personal Services (1987) as Mr. Gardner

References

External links

1912 births
1989 deaths
English male stage actors
English male film actors
English male television actors
Male actors from London
20th-century English male actors